Bossanova Ballroom is an event space and former theater located at 722 East Burnside Street in Portland, Oregon's Buckman neighborhood, in the United States. It features a dance floor, two stages and bars, and a game room. The venue has hosted comedy shows, and the queer event Blow Pony.

References

External links

 
 

Buckman, Portland, Oregon
Buildings and structures in Portland, Oregon
Former theatres in the United States